Alexander Chisholm (1790 – October 9, 1854) was a political figure in Upper Canada.

He was born in Scotland in 1790 and migrated to Glengarry County in 1817. In 1825, he became a colonel in the local militia. He represented the county in the 12th and 13th Parliaments. He died at Alexandria in 1854.

External links 
Glengarry's Representatives in the Legislative Assembly of Upper Canada

1790 births
1854 deaths
Members of the Legislative Assembly of Upper Canada
People from the United Counties of Stormont, Dundas and Glengarry
Scottish emigrants to pre-Confederation Ontario
Immigrants to Upper Canada